Luis López (born 8 March 1955) is a Spanish sailor. He competed in the Tornado event at the 1988 Summer Olympics.

References

External links
 

1955 births
Living people
Spanish male sailors (sport)
Olympic sailors of Spain
Sailors at the 1988 Summer Olympics – Tornado
Sportspeople from Santander, Spain
Sailors (sport) from Cantabria